The 1940 Michigan State Spartans football team represented Michigan State College as an independent during the 1940 college football season. In their eighth season under head coach Charlie Bachman, the Spartans compiled a 3–4–1 record and lost their annual rivalry game with Michigan by a 21 to 14 score. In inter-sectional play, the team lost to Temple (21–19) and Kansas State (32–0), played Santa Clara to a scoreless tie, and defeated West Virginia (17–0).

Schedule

Game summaries

Michigan

On October 5, 1940, Michigan State lost to Michigan by a 21 to 14 score. The game was the 35th played between the two programs. Tom Harmon scored all 21 points for Michigan on three touchdowns and three kicks for extra point. Michigan gained 312 rushing yards compared to 49 rushing yards for Michigan State. Both Michigan State touchdowns were scored by right halfback Walt Pawlowski.

References

Michigan State
Michigan State Spartans football seasons
Michigan State Spartans football